Mikhail Valentinovich Krotov (born March 14, 1963) is a Russian lawyer, businessman and official.

Career 
On April 28, 1995, he was elected deputy chairman of the board of directors of the Baltic Sea Steamship Company. On October 2, 1995, as the Chairman Ivan Lushchinsky had been shot dead, Krotov became the chairman of its board of directors and held this position until summer 1996.

In 2005, he was a first deputy director general of the Gazprom Media holding.

Since November 7, 2005, he has been President Vladimir Putin's envoy to the Constitutional Court of the Russian Federation. He was succeeded by former Justice Minister Alexander Konovalov in January 2020.

In July 2020 Krotov was appointed judge of the Supreme Court by the Federation Council. He is a member of the Judicial Collegium for Civil Cases.

References 

Russian businesspeople in transport
Lawyers from Saint Petersburg
Medvedev Administration personnel
Living people
Saint Petersburg State University alumni
1963 births
1st class Active State Councillors of the Russian Federation
Gazprom people
Businesspeople in shipping